Geeta Rani (born 16 September 1981) is an Indian Weightlifter. She won the gold medal in the Women's +75 kg category at the 2006 Commonwealth Games. She won three silver medals in the Asian Championship in 2004 and a bronze medal
in the 2003 Afro-Asian Games held in Hyderabad. In 2010 Commonwealth Games, she ranked 4th in the Women's +75 kg category.

Awards and honors
In 2006, she received the Arjuna Award.

References

External links

Commonwealth Games gold medallists for India
Weightlifters at the 2006 Commonwealth Games
Indian female weightlifters
1981 births
Living people
Recipients of the Arjuna Award
Weightlifters at the 2010 Commonwealth Games
Weightlifters at the 2010 Asian Games
Commonwealth Games medallists in weightlifting
21st-century Indian women
20th-century Indian women
Asian Games competitors for India
Medallists at the 2006 Commonwealth Games